Janine may refer to:

People and characters 
 Janine (given name)

Music 
 "Janine" (David Bowie song), a 1969 song by David Bowie
 "Janine", a 1979 song by Trooper from the album Flying Colors
 "Janine", a 1994 song by Soul Coughing from the album Ruby Vroom
 "Janine" (Bushido song), a 2006 song by Bushido

Movies 
 Janine, a 1961 short film by Maurice Pialat
 Janine, a 1990 film by Cheryl Dunye

See also 
 
 
 Jeanine
 Jeannine